Hisashi Okamoto (岡本 久, Okamoto Hisashi, born 23 November 1956) is a Japanese applied mathematician, specializing in mathematical fluid mechanics and computational fluid dynamics.

Okamoto graduated from the  University of Tokyo in March 1979. In April 1981 he became a research associate to Hiroshi Fujita (known for the Fujita-Kato theorem) at the University of Tokyo. There in 1985 he received his Doctorate of Science with Fujita as advisor. For the academic year 1986–1987 Okamoto was a visiting fellow at the University of Minnesota's Institute for Mathematics and Its Applications. In August 1987 Okamoto became an associate professor in the University of Tokyo's Department of Applied Science. In 1988 he visited the National University of Singapore. At Kyoto University's Research Institute for Mathematical Sciences (RIMS), he became an associate professor in April 1990 and a full professor in April 1994. At RIMS he was Head of the Computer Science Research Laboratory from 2004 to 2005 and deputy director in 2006, 2009, and 2011. He is editor-in-chief of the Japan Journal of Industrial and Applied Mathematics (JJIAM).

Okamoto is the author or co-author of over 100 articles in refereed journals or in books of conference proceedings. He wrote, with Mayumi Shōji, the 2001 monograph The mathematical theory of permanent progressive water-waves.

Awards and honors
 1998 — Invited Speaker, International Congress of Mathematicians, Berlin 1998
 2002 — Inoue Science Award
 2011 — President of the East Asia SIAM, 2011–2012
 2013 — Fellow of the Japan Society of Fluid Mechanics
 2013 — Fellow of the Japan Society for Industrial and Applied Mathematics
 2015 — Plenary Lecturer, Mathematical Society of Japan, September 2015.
 2016 — Hiroshi Fujiwara Prize on Mathematical Science

References

1956 births
Living people
20th-century Japanese mathematicians
21st-century Japanese mathematicians
Applied mathematicians
Numerical analysts
Fluid dynamicists
University of Tokyo alumni
Academic staff of Kyoto University